José Joaquín Mora Porras  (1818–1860) was a Costa Rican politician.  He was the younger brother of the presidents of that country, Juan Rafael Mora Porras and Miguel Mora Porras and was deputy commander of San Jose, Costa Rica. During the war against the filibusters, he played an important role as deputy commander in chief of the army of Costa Rica and Central forces chief.

His great-great-granddaughter is actress Madeleine Stowe.

1818 births
1860 deaths
Costa Rican politicians